Kikół  is a village in Lipno County, Kuyavian-Pomeranian Voivodeship, in north-central Poland. It is the seat of the gmina (administrative district) called Gmina Kikół. It is located on the eastern shore of Lake Kikolskie in the Dobrzyń Land.

The village has a population of 1,500.

History
During the German occupation of Poland (World War II), Poles from Kikół were among the victims of large massacres of Poles from the county carried out by the Germans in nearby Karnkowo as part of the Intelligenzaktion. The local school principal was among Polish principals and teachers murdered in the Mauthausen concentration camp.

Notable residents
Meyer Wolf Weisgal (1894–1977), American journalist, publisher, and playwright; President of the Weizmann Institute of Science

References

Villages in Lipno County
Populated lakeshore places in Poland
Płock Governorate
Warsaw Voivodeship (1919–1939)
Pomeranian Voivodeship (1919–1939)